Fatima Rama (born 28 January 1981) is a Papua New Guinean footballer who plays as a forward. She has been a member of the Papua New Guinea women's national team.

Fatima Rama was a senior women's national team representative in football (soccer) before she switched codes to become a rugby union player.

References

1981 births
Living people
Women's association football forwards
Papua New Guinean women's footballers
Papua New Guinea women's international footballers
Papua New Guinean female rugby union players
Papua New Guinea international women's rugby sevens players